Burping (also called belching and eructation) is the release of gas from the upper digestive tract (esophagus and stomach) of animals through the mouth. It is usually audible.

In humans, burping can be caused by normal eating processes, or as a side effect of other medical conditions. There is a range of levels of social acceptance for burping: within certain context and cultures, burping is acceptable, while in others it is offensive or unacceptable. Failure to burp can cause pain or other negative effects.

Humans are not the only animals that burp: it is very common among other mammals. In particular, burping by domesticated ruminants, such as cows or sheep, is a major contributor of methane emissions which cause climate change and have a negative effect on the environment. Significant research is being done to find mitigation strategies for ruminant burping, i.e. modifying the animals' diets with Asparagopsis taxiformis (red seaweed).

Causes
Burping is usually caused by swallowing air when eating or drinking and subsequently expelling it, in which case the expelled gas is mainly a mixture of nitrogen and oxygen. 
Burps can be caused by drinking beverages containing carbon dioxide, such as beer and soft drinks, in which case the expelled gas is mainly carbon dioxide.  
Diabetes drugs such as metformin and exenatide can cause burping, especially at higher doses. This often resolves in a few weeks. 
Burping combined with other symptoms such as dyspepsia, nausea and heartburn may be a sign of an ulcer or hiatal hernia, and should be reviewed by a physician. 
Other causes of burping include food allergies, gallbladder diseases, H. pylori, acid reflux disease and gastritis.

Complications
In microgravity environments, burping is frequently associated with regurgitation, known as wet burping. With reduced gravity, the stomach contents are more likely to rise up into the esophagus when the gastroesophageal sphincter is relaxed, along with the expelled air.

Disorders
Inability to burp is uncommon.
Chest pain associated with burping can occur, but is rare.
Retrograde cricopharyngeus dysfunction (R-CPD) or retrograde upper esophageal sphincter dysfunction (R-UESD) involves the cricopharyngeus muscle not being able to relax. R-CPD was first discovered in 2015. Common symptoms include gurgling noises, bloating, and flatulence; lesser but common symptoms can be potentially painful hiccups, nausea, constipation, hypersalivation, or shortness of breath.   A high resolution manometry, esophageal manometry or fluoroscopy by an ENT doctor is able to assess the issue. 80% of patients were successfully treated with Botox after a single injection. An alternative if the injection is unsuccessful is to undergo partial cricopharyngeal myotomy.

Society and culture

Acceptance

Some South Asian cultures view burping as acceptable in particular situations. For example, a burping guest can be a sign to the host that the meal satisfied them and they are full.

In Japan, burping during a meal is considered bad manners. Burping during a meal is also considered unacceptable in Western cultures, such as North America and Europe. In Middle Eastern countries, it is not acceptable to burp out loud in public, and one should silence one's burp, or at least attempt to do so.

Despite virtually no scientific research on the subject, small online communities exist for burping as a sexual fetish. Online, both men and women of any sexual orientation anecdotally report some attraction to burping, with what appears to be psychological and/or behavioural overlaps with other sexual fetishes including body inflation, feederism, vorarephilia, and farting fetishes. Anecdotally, the 'loudness' aspect appears to be an important element to burp fetishists. Despite being a rather uncommon fetish, it continues to follow a general well-known pattern of sexual behaviour where hearing influences sexual arousal and response, noting that "it is the noise made rather than the action itself that appears to be what is sexualized and/or interpreted by the fetishist as sexually pleasurable and arousing".

Infants

Babies are likely to accumulate gas in the stomach while feeding and experience considerable discomfort (and agitation) until assisted. Burping an infant involves placing the child in a position conducive to gas expulsion (for example against the adult's shoulder, with the infant's stomach resting on the adult's chest) and then lightly patting the lower back.  Because burping can cause vomiting, a "burp cloth" or "burp pad" is sometimes employed on the shoulder to protect clothing.

Contest
The Guinness World Record for the loudest burp is 109.9 dB, set by Paul Hunn at Butlins Bognor Regis, United Kingdom, on 23 August 2009.

Burped speech
It is possible to voluntarily induce burping through swallowing air and then expelling it, and by manipulation of the vocal tract produce burped speech.

While this is often employed as a means of entertainment or competition, it can also act as an alternative means of vocalisation for people who have undergone a laryngectomy, with the burp replacing laryngeal phonation. This is known as esophageal speech.

Other animals
Many other mammals, such as cows, dogs and sheep, also burp.

Ruminants
Much of the gas expelled is produced as a byproduct of the ruminant's digestive process.  These gases notably include a large volume of methane, produced exclusively by a narrow cohort of methanogenic archaea in the animal's gut; Escherichia coli (E. coli) and other bacteria lack the enzymes and cofactors required for methane production. A lactating cow produces about 322g of methane per day, i.e. more than 117 kg per year through burping and exhalation, making commercially farmed cows a major (37%) contributor to anthropogenic methane emissions, and hence to the greenhouse effect. 95% of this gas (wind) is emitted through burping. This has led scientists at the Commonwealth Scientific and Industrial Research Organisation of Perth, Australia, to develop an anti-methanogen vaccine to minimize methane in cow burps.

One reason why cows burp so much is that they are often fed foods that their digestive systems cannot fully process, such as corn and soy. Some farmers have reduced burping in their cows by feeding them alfalfa and flaxseed, which are closer to the grasses that they had eaten in the wild before they were domesticated.

The failure to burp successfully can be fatal. This is particularly common among domesticated ruminants that are allowed to gorge themselves on spring clover or alfalfa. The condition, known as ruminal tympany, is a high-pressure buildup of gas in the stomach(s) and requires immediate treatment to expel the gas, usually the insertion of a flexible rubber hose down the esophagus, or in extreme cases the lancing of the animal's side with a trochar and cannula.

Birds
There is no documented evidence that birds burp, though ornithologists believe that there is nothing which physiologically prevents them from doing so.  However, since the microbiota of birds do not include the same set of gas-producing bacteria that mammals have to aid in digestion, gas hardly builds up in the gastrointestinal tracts of birds.

See also 
 Flatulence
 Hiccup
 Penelope and the Humongous Burp

References

External links 

Reflexes
Symptoms and signs: Digestive system and abdomen